Tigranakert or Tigranavan was an ancient Armenian city founded by Tigranes the Great, King of Armenia in the 1st century BCE. It was located near the village of Bananiyar (Aparanner) in present-day Nakhchivan, Azerbaijan. It was one of four cities established by Tigranes the Great which carry his name. The one at Nakhchivan is said to have served as a residence for Tigranes' sister, Tigranuhi.

Etymology

The name Tigranakert consists of the name of Tigranes the Great with the Armenian suffix -kert, meaning “made by”. Therefore, the literal translation of the city name is “Made by Tigran.” Additionally, the name Tigranavan comes from the same origin but instead uses the Armenian suffix -avan, meaning town.

In later periods, the site was commonly known as Aparank (also Aparan, Aparanner), which is the Armenian word for palace.

History

This settlement, often mentioned in both Armenian and non-Armenian sources as Aparan/Aparank, was located in the present day village of Bənəniyar in the Julfa region. With the combination of historical-bibliographic data from historians Mikayel Chamchian and Ghevont Alishan, we can conclude that this city was located on the site of Tigranakert, where Tigranes settled his sister Tigranuhi (not to be confused with Tigranakert, the capital city founded by Tigranes further to the west). Movses Khorenatsi writes about this in his book titled The History of Armenia, that "... (Tigran) sends his sister Tigranuhi to Armenia as a king and in large numbers, the settlement that Tigranes built in his name, that is, Tigranakert, the provinces call for his service  to put in.  And the aristocratic class called the Vosta of those parts says that it originated from this generation, as if it were a royal generation."

Later, this settlement has been mentioned as a city since the 1st century, during the invasions of the Roman general Corbulo on the city of Artashat, due to the resistance organized by the Armenians.

In the Middle Ages, Tigranavan had a population of 500,000-600,000 Armenians and occupied a 
large area within its fortified walls. The vestiges of some 
of the buildings, winepresses, and cemeteries of the earlier town can still be seen today in the vineyards and the fields surrounding the present-day village.

17th century traveler, John Tavernier, who passed through 
Aparank, wrote admiringly of it, stating that: “with its delightful vineyards, fruit-bearing trees, and all the amenities of life, it was one of the most beautiful places 
in Asia.”

This town is mentioned in the History of Step'anos Orbelian, as Aparank' in the district of Yerjank. Beginning with the fourteenth century, the historical sources speak about it frequently as the center of the Unitores (Armenians who converted to Catholicism). According 
to the colophon of a manuscript copied by Mxit'ar of Aparan, the religious monuments of Aparaner were named after the "Holy Mother of God, Saint Stephen the Protomartyr, the Apostle Saint James and All Saints." Unfortunately these monuments are now completely destroyed and razed to the ground. The sources do not give us any descriptive or historical information on them. 
There is only limited information about the All Saints Church, which was the seat of the Unitor diocesan bishop, the episcopal see of the Catholic Congregation.

The grandiose complex of the All Saints Church of Aparank stood on a small hill in the central area of the old town. The ruined traces of the latter were visible until 1970. Visiting Aparank at the end of the nineteenth century, A. Sedrakian described the semidilapidated 
church: "The church is built of stones and lime mortar to the level of the arches. The arches and the roof are built of baked bricks. The vaulted church is divided into three chapels of which the middle one, with its four pillars, is 
the largest; each chapel has a cupola." 31 According to Ghewond Alishan, the roof and the cupolas were destroyed during the earthquake of 1848.

A number of khachkars and tombstones erected in other parts of the apse building of the All-Saints Church had lithographs dating to the 12th-14th centuries. Inside the church, there was a secret ambush, from where in 1870, a number of vessels, jewelry and other items were found.

Judging by the lithographs of the All-Saints Church, it should be considered acceptable that the former church of this monument was founded before the 10th-11th centuries, on the ruins of which the episcopal church of the monks was built in the 14th century.

See also
Goghtn
Armenians in Nakhchivan
Armenian Catholic Church

References

Armenian culture
Armenian Highlands